The Warsaw Zoological Garden, known simply as the Warsaw Zoo, is a scientific zoo located alongside the Vistula River in Warsaw, Poland. It is home to over 11,000 animals representing more than 500 species.

The zoo is an accredited member of the European Association of Zoos and Aquaria (EAZA) and the World Association of Zoos and Aquariums (WAZA).

The Warsaw Zoo served as a hiding place for Jews and escapees from the Warsaw Ghetto during World War II. Zookeepers Jan and Antonina Żabiński, responsible for saving hundreds of Jews within the zoo premises, were eventually granted the title of Righteous Among the Nations for their contribution, effort and good will. These events were documented in the novel The Zookeeper's Wife by Diane Ackerman and in the 2017 war drama film starring Jessica Chastain.

History

Establishment 
Although the current zoo was opened on 11 March 1928, its roots can be traced to 17th century private menageries, often open to the public. King John III Sobieski kept a court menagerie in Wilanów, and the  19th century saw several private zoos opened in the city.

M. Pągowski opened a small zoo on Koszykowa Street in 1926, and moved this zoo to a new  area on 3 Maja Avenue in 1927. The construction of the  City Zoological Garden was started in 1927 as well. In November 1927 the zoo gained a director when Wenanty Burdziński, former director and founder of the zoological garden in Kyiv, was appointed to the post. Construction of the zoo was fast, and the zoo was opened in March 1928, with some animals purchased from M. Pągowski and some donated by the Pedagogical Museum, which had a small zoo on its premises. Animals resident at the zoo when it opened included lions, tigers, and a female Indian elephant named Kasia.

Wenanty Burdziński died of acute pneumonia before the end of 1928, and Jan Żabiński was appointed director. Before World War II, Jan oversaw the creation of several exhibits including the monkey house, elephant house, enclosures for antelopes, a seal pond, and the giraffe barn. He was director of the zoo until 1939, was re-appointed in 1949, and continued in the post until 1951.

In 1937 the zoo's female elephant Kasia gave birth to the first Indian elephant born in a Polish zoo.

World War II 

The zoo was bombed regularly in September 1939, and many animals died from the bombs, bullets (e.g. apes) or missiles (e.g. an elephant, a giraffe). After the surrender of Warsaw to the Germans, most of the 'valuable'  animal species (in the eyes of German representative Lutz Heck) were taken to the Schorfeide reserve in Germany, while others, described as 'not valuable' were shot, and the zoo was closed. During World War II, Jan Żabiński, the director, together with his wife Antonina and their son Ryszard, saved more than 300 Jews from the Holocaust. Jan Żabinski was seriously injured during the 1944 Warsaw uprising, and taken prisoner. When he returned, animals started being reintroduced to the zoo, which was reopened in 1949.

Exhibits

Elephants 
This  exhibit was opened in 2003, and includes two outdoor pools, an indoor pool, and individual indoor paddocks and an indoor walk for the African elephants. As of 2012, it houses one male and three female elephants.

Hippopotamus House & Shark Aquarium 
Opened in April 2010, this facility has both an outdoor and indoor pool for the Hippos. The indoor hippo pool includes a large glass area where visitors can watch the hippos underwater. Past the hippo pool and in a shaded room is a  salt water tank, which is the largest single fish tank in Poland. The aquarium includes the only sand tiger shark in Poland, as well as other fish, including Arabian carpet sharks, Zebrasoma species, yellow tang, and other reef species.

Ape House 
The Ape House was opened in September 2008, and is home to the zoo's gorillas and chimpanzees. As of 2012, the zoo was home to 3 gorillas and 9 chimpanzees. Visitors can observe the apes from large indoor paths surrounded by water, or from outside the building, separated from the apes by glass.

Directors
 Wenanty Burdziński, until 1928
 Jan Żabiński, 1928-1951
 Jan Landowski, 1951-1972
 Zbigniew Woliński, 1972-1981
 Jan Maciej Rembiszewski, 1982-2009
 Andrzej Kruszewicz, from 2009

Popular culture
In 2007, an American writer Diane Ackerman published her non-fiction biography titled The Zookeeper's Wife, which tells the story of the Żabiński family's activities during World War II that draws upon Antonina Żabińska's diary.

The book by Ackerman about the couple, The Zookeeper's Wife, was made into a movie in 2015 and released on March 31, 2017, starring American actress Jessica Chastain portraying Antonina and Belgian actor Johan Heldenbergh portraying the director of the zoo Jan.

Gallery

See also
Wrocław Zoo
Poznań Zoo

Notes

External links

1928 establishments in Poland
Buildings and structures in Warsaw
Parks in Warsaw
Zoos in Poland
Zoos established in 1928
Praga-Północ